Domantas Šimkus (born 10 February 1996) is a Lithuanian footballer who plays as a midfielder for Slovenian PrvaLiga side Mura.

Club career
On 22 August 2022, Šimkus signed a two-year contract with Slovenian PrvaLiga side Mura. He made his debut against Gorica on 2 September 2022 in a goalless draw.

International career
Šimkus made his Lithuania national football team debut on 17 November 2018 in a 2018–19 UEFA Nations League C game against Romania.

Notes

References

External links
 
 

1996 births
Living people
Sportspeople from Šiauliai
Lithuanian footballers
Association football midfielders
FK Atlantas players
FK Žalgiris players
Hapoel Kfar Saba F.C. players
Sabail FK players
NŠ Mura players
A Lyga players
Israeli Premier League players
Azerbaijan Premier League players
Slovenian PrvaLiga players
Lithuanian expatriate footballers
Expatriate men's footballers in Denmark
Expatriate footballers in Israel
Expatriate footballers in Azerbaijan
Expatriate footballers in Slovenia
Lithuanian expatriate sportspeople in Denmark
Lithuanian expatriate sportspeople in Israel
Lithuanian expatriate sportspeople in Azerbaijan
Lithuanian expatriate sportspeople in Slovenia
Lithuania youth international footballers
Lithuania under-21 international footballers
Lithuania international footballers